The 1998 killing of Iranian diplomats in Afghanistan refers to the siege of the Iranian consulate in Mazar-i-Sharif, in the Taliban-controlled Afghanistan during the Taliban and Northern Alliance battles of Mazar-i-Sharif. Initially, the death of 8 Iranian diplomats was reported, but later two other diplomats and a journalist were also confirmed dead, bringing the total deaths to 11. The killings of the diplomats is speculated to have been carried out by Sipah-e-Sahaba Pakistan.

Background

Before this incident, Iran was supportive of the Afghan Northern Alliance, and the city of Mazari Sharif was one of the headquarters of the alliance. It is reported that between May and July 1997 Abdul Malik Pahlawan executed thousands of Taliban prisoners as revenge for the 1995 death of Abdul Ali Mazari. "He is widely believed to have been responsible for the brutal massacre of up to 3,000 Taliban prisoners after inviting them into Mazar-i-Sharif." As revenge, Taliban forces captured Mazar-i-Sharif and killed hundreds of Northern Alliance members, particularly members of the Hazara and Uzbek ethnic groups as they were accused of being the ones who carried out the killings of Taliban prisoners.

Events
On 8 August 1998, Taliban forces captured Mazar-i-Sharif. After this incident, 11 Iranian diplomats and Mahmoud Saremi, a correspondent from Iran's state news agency (IRNA), were attacked at the Iranian consulate and subsequently disappeared. Unofficial reports from the city indicated that all these men were killed. Later it was confirmed that 8 of the Iranian diplomats and Saremi were killed by the Taliban militia attacking the consulate. The Taliban spokesmen said the Iranians had been killed by renegade forces who had acted without orders. The final death toll was confirmed later to be 11 according to Tehran Times.

Aftermath
This incident caused a public furor in Iran and many observers were concerned that Iran would be involved in a military response to the attack. At the time, over 70,000 Iranian troops were deployed along the Afghan border. Mediation by the United Nations defused the situation and all the hostages were eventually released. Later in February 1999, the Taliban and Iran held talks, but relations between them did not improve. Subsequently, Iran decided to support the Northern Alliance, an anti-Taliban front.

August 8 is named National Journalists' Day in Iran, in memory of Mahmoud Saremi, the IRNA correspondent killed in this attack.

Film
An Iranian film  Mazar Sharif  was made on this story in 2015. Abdolhassan Barzideh was the director.

See also
 Attack on the Iranian Embassy in London (2018)

References

Iranian Diplomats Assassination In Afghanistan, 1998
Iranian Diplomats Assassination In Afghanistan, 1998
Afghanistan–Iran relations
Conflicts in 1998
Diplomatic incidents
Hostage taking in Afghanistan
Iranian people murdered abroad
Iranian terrorism victims
Assassinated Iranian journalists
People murdered in Afghanistan
Terrorism deaths in Afghanistan
Attacks on diplomatic missions of Iran
Attacks on diplomatic missions in Afghanistan
Afghan Civil War (1996–2001)
August 1998 events in Asia
Massacres committed by the Taliban